Caitlin Dulany is an American actress and activist.

Early life
She was born in Iowa City, Iowa on June 22, 1963. Once her family moved to Brooklyn, New York, she attended St. Ann's School in Brooklyn Heights, where her mother, Barry Dulany, was a teacher. Her father, Harris Dulany, a novelist and poet, also made films with documentary photographer and filmmaker Danny Lyon, a close family friend. Following multiple accusations, against Harvey Weinstein, including one in which she was named, Dulany and Jessica Barth launched Voices in Action. Dulany's story was told in Untouchable, a documentary about the Harvey Weinstein story.

Career
Dulany's career began at the age of 14 when she was cast in an off-Broadway play, Playing Dolls at Ensemble Studio Theatre in Manhattan. She subsequently graduated from Northwestern University with a BA in Theatre, and pursued a bi coastal acting career.

Her film work includes Red Shoe Diaries, Maniac Cop III, Rescuing Desire, the Todd Phillip's produced Project X, Spike Lee's Oldboy and Akiva Goldsman's directorial debut, Winter's Tale. Among her television roles are: guest appearances on Ally McBeal, Law and Order, CSI: Miami, Castle, Criminal Minds, Life Goes On and Moon Over Miami. She has also played recurring roles as a love interest to Anthony Edwards on ER and as Holly Hunter's sister on Saving Grace. In 2022, she appeared as a witch in the second-season premiere of American Horror Stories.

References

External links
 

Year of birth missing (living people)
Living people
American film actresses
American television actresses
People from Iowa City, Iowa
Northwestern University School of Communication alumni
Saint Ann's School (Brooklyn) alumni
21st-century American women